Goodwin Acres is a historic home located in East Goshen Township, Chester County, Pennsylvania. It was built about 1736, with two additions made about 1749 and about 1840.  It is a -story, four-bay by one-bay, coursed fieldstone dwelling with a gable roof with dormers.  The west addition is a low, one-story structure with a gently pitched gable roof.  The east addition is one-story.  The additions are unified to the main structure by a porch.  An enclosed porch and library were added in 1941.  Also on the property are a stone-and-frame Pennsylvania bank barn (c. 1900) and a stone spring house.

It was listed on the National Register of Historic Places in 1980.

References

Houses on the National Register of Historic Places in Pennsylvania
Houses completed in 1840
Houses in Chester County, Pennsylvania
National Register of Historic Places in Chester County, Pennsylvania